This is a list of active, dormant, and extinct volcanoes in Thailand.

References

External links
Phanom Rung at WikiMapia
Doi Pha Khok Hin Fu at WikiMapia

Thailand
 
Volcanoes